Gillingham School is a coeducational school situated in Gillingham in North Dorset, England. Gillingham Grammar School can trace its foundation back to 1516. It was founded as a Free School, paid for out of the proceeds of land gifted to the school by several local landowners, and was managed by twelve trustees or Feoffees. Evidence exists to prove that the Gillingham Free School persisted without a break until the present day although the format has metamorphosed to a Grammar school and then to its present Comprehensive status. Among its distinguished alumni was Edward Hyde, who became the 1st Earl of Clarendon, and Lord High Chancellor of England 1661–1667. Edward Frampton was the headmaster in 1648 and he became Bishop of Gloucester in 1680.

Over the years the school further prospered, and in 1916 girls were admitted for the first time. It was in 1926 that the school came under the control of the Dorset County Council who agreed to pay the staff salaries and provide grants for most education needs. In 1940 a County "Modern School" for the less academically able was built in a field next to the Grammar School and in 1959 the two schools combined into a Comprehensive School. Over the years and particularly in recent times the buildings were modernised and eventually all were replaced. The present school now has a roll of over 1600 pupils and a high reputation for achievement.

Gillingham School is divided up into 10 form tutors, each with a name which relates to the school in one way or another. They are; Baxter, Clarendon, Davenant, Fletcher, George-Butler, Hurley, Matthews, Lyndon, Seager, and Wagner. As a comprehensive school, Year 7 - 11 have these tutors, each with roughly 32 pupils in. The Gillingham School Sixth Form are sorted into tutors, however the names are different from the school. The names are the initials of the form tutor teacher themselves.

The Gillingham School sixth form attracts students from a large surrounding region and the school was rated 'good' in the latest Ofsted report.

Notable alumni
 Yvonne Fletcher – Metropolitan Police officer murdered in a 1984 diplomatic incident
 Neil Lyndon – writer and journalist.
 Adam Tomkins – Conservative Member of the Scottish Parliament
 Josh Sims – football player, currently playing for Southampton
 Lloyd Isgrove – football player, currently playing for Barnsley
 Jonathan Brearley - CEO of GB energy regular Ofgem

Racism
In 2022 it was revealed that the school had neglected over 30 reports of racism from a family that included a teacher and three students who later contacted the Member of Parliament for North Dorset Simon Hoare after the matter was subject to a BBC article.

See also
 List of English and Welsh endowed schools (19th century)

References

Secondary schools in Dorset
1516 establishments in England
Educational institutions established in the 1510s
Voluntary controlled schools in England
Gillingham, Dorset